The Air Conditioning, Heating, and Refrigeration Institute (AHRI), formed in 2008 by a merger of the Air-Conditioning and Refrigeration Institute (ARI) and the Gas Appliance Manufacturers Association (GAMA), is a North American trade association of manufacturers of air conditioning, heating, and commercial refrigeration equipment. 

The organization performs political advocacy on behalf of its member industries, maintains technical standards, certifies products, shares data, conducts research, and awards scholarships.

AHRI's 2017 annual meeting was held at Trump National Doral Miami. AHRI paid Trump Doral $700,650 for the event. Two weeks later, the Trump administration announced support for the Kigali Accord to the Montreal Protocol, a move that was lobbied by and celebrated by AHRI.

It also has a research arm, the  Air-Conditioning, Heating and Refrigeration Technology Institute (AHRTI).

See also
AHRI Standard 700

References

External links
 Official Website

Heating, ventilation, and air conditioning
Trade associations based in the United States